Adrià Miquel "Miki" Bosch Sanchis (born 9 June 2001) is a Spanish professional footballer who plays as a central defender for Club Recreativo Granada.

Club career
Born in Alginet, Valencian Community, Bosch represented EF Alginet, FC Massanassa, Levante UD and UD Alzira as a youth. He made his first team debut with the latter on 26 August 2018, coming on as a second-half substitute in a 3–0 Tercera División away loss against CF La Nucía.

On 2 December 2019, Bosch moved to Valencia CF and returned to youth football. On 1 October 2020, he renewed his contract with the Che until 2023, and was immediately loaned to Segunda División B side SD Tarazona.

In December 2020, after featuring in only 19 minutes for Tarazona, Bosch's loan was cut short, and he returned to Alzira also on loan. Back to Valencia in July 2021, he was assigned to the reserves in Tercera División RFEF.

On 20 July 2022, Bosch moved to another reserve team, Club Recreativo Granada in Segunda Federación. He made his first team debut the following 4 March, replacing injured Raúl Torrente in a 3–1 Segunda División away win over Burgos CF.

References

External links

2001 births
Living people
People from Ribera Alta (comarca)
Spanish footballers
Footballers from the Valencian Community
Association football defenders
Segunda División players
Segunda División B players
Segunda Federación players
Tercera División players
Tercera Federación players
UD Alzira footballers
Valencia CF Mestalla footballers
SD Tarazona footballers
Club Recreativo Granada players
Granada CF footballers